Nandivada is a village in Krishna district of the Indian state of Andhra Pradesh. It is located in Nandivada mandal of Gudivada revenue division. It is one of the villages in the mandal to be a part of Andhra Pradesh Capital Region. Geographically, it is 8 kilometres north of Gudivada and directly adjacent to the town of Sreenivasapuram.

Demographics 

The total population is constituted of  males,  females, and  children in the age group of 0–6 years. The average literacy rate stands at 75.30% with  literates, significantly higher than the national average of 73.00%.

Religion 

Nandivada was predominantly Hindu for centuries. According to census records, prior to 1911, no Christians were recorded to have resided in Nandivada village. In 2001 it was recorded that all Madigas and 61% of Malas, historically untouchable castes, were Christian.

A Chidananda ashram was built in the village in 1966 with land allotted by Sri Adusumilli Nagayya. The ashram was run by Nagayya's daughter, Smt. Dasari Meenakshamma, from 1969 to 1996, and was later taken over by her son and is now run by her daughter-in-law. It was said people from as far as Mopidevi would travel to the ashram.

Initially, Nandivada had a substantial Christian population, mostly gained during the Great Depression as converts to Christianity were often given land by missionaries. However, as of the 2011 census, the Christian population decreased.

History

Early History 

Initially, Nandivada experienced explosive growth as the result of in-migration from dry areas in Krishna district after the devastating results of the Guntur famine of 1832. The first village headman, or munsif, of Nandivada, was Adusumilli Ankanna, around the 1850s. Adusumilli Ankanna was also a distant relative of Adusumilli Lingayya, who built the Nagendra Swamy Temple in Nandivada. Ankanna's daughter, "Mooga" Mahalakshmamma, was married to Vemulapalli Pedda Kodandaramayya. Thereafter, all village munsifs came from the Vemulapalli family, until the munsif system was abolished. The position of Karanam was held by the Brahmin Nandivada family from the early 20th century until the position's abolition.

Freedom Struggle 

Many freedom fighters originated from or held activities in Nandivada.

On 25 May 1932, Nutakki Sitaramamma (1914-1934), Surapaneni (née Punukula) Venkata Subbamma (born 1912), and Chagarlamudi (née Vellanki) Kameswaramma were arrested at Nandivada.

Panuri Sundaramma (died 1960) and her husband, Venkata Reddy, participated in the independence struggle and they were arrested on 27 June 1932. Her husband worked for the Indian National Congress from 1930 to 1942.

Gadireddi (née Kondapalli) Putlamma (born 1911) was the daughter of Kondapalli Venka Reddy and wife of Gadireddi Raghava Reddy. She was sentenced to ten months' imprisonment for distributing pro-Congress bulletins on 16 March 1933, and was later released on 31 August 1933 as a term of the Gandhi–Irwin Pact.

Mandal Status 

When Andhra Pradesh was reorganized into mandals by NTR on 29 July 1986, Nandivada was declared as part of Moturu mandal. A few days later the decision was reversed and Nandivada was given its own mandal status, under the suggestion of Dasari Gopala Krishna. Gopala Krishna was NTR's close friend and fellow actor and he would also enter politics, serving as Nandivada's panchayat president from 1988 to his death in 1992. Nandivada's mandal status was one of only two changes to NTR's bill, the other addition being the mandal status of Pedaparupudi, a case pleaded by Cherukuri Ramoji Rao.

See also 

Villages in Nandivada mandal

Notes

References 

Villages in Krishna district
Mandal headquarters in Krishna district
Villages in Andhra Pradesh Capital Region